Richard Michael Dawson (born 1981) is an English folk-influenced musician from Newcastle upon Tyne. His 2014 album Nothing Important was released by Weird World and was met with critical acclaim. His 2017 album Peasant received similar acclaim, and was chosen by The Quietus as their album of the year. In 2019, he released the album 2020, again to critical acclaim. Released on Weird World (an imprint of Domino Records) in late November 2021, Henki, a collaborative album made with the Finnish band Circle, was announced in September 2021.

Career
Dawson grew up in Newcastle and became interested in singing as a child, attempting to emulate American singers such as Faith No More's Mike Patton. He worked in record stores for 10 years before starting a professional music career. He bought an inexpensive acoustic guitar but accidentally broke it. After the guitar was repaired, he found it had a unique sound and he has used it as his main instrument.

Dawson's music has been described as a deconstruction of folk music, done in an English style, similar to what American Captain Beefheart did with blues music. Dawson himself cites Qawwali, a form of Sufi devotional music, Kenyan folk guitarist Henry Makobi and folk musician Mike Waterson as influences on his work. The albums The Glass Trunk (2013) and Nothing Important (2014) feature collaborations with harpist Rhodri Davies, who Dawson describes as "somewhat of a kindred spirit". Dawson and Davies released a collaborative album, Dawson-Davies: Hen Ogledd, in 2013 and Dawson has also released solo material pseudonymously under the name "Eyeballs".
Dawson has also performed in the groups Hot Fog with Mike Vest (Bong), Moon with Ben Jones and Sarah Sullivan (Jazzfinger), and played a handful of shows on guitar with Khunnt.

Since Nothing Important, Dawson has played the guitar through a Fender and an Orange amplifier in series. He also used synthesized sounds from an iOS application, ThumbJam, and played saxophone despite having only a rudimentary knowledge of the instrument.

Lyrically, Dawson's material deals with dark subjects such as death. For The Glass Trunk, he searched a database in the Tyne and Wear archives for "death" and took inspiration from old news stories involving murder and bodily harm. The track "The Vile Stuff" from Nothing Important describes a continuous narrative of events, including one where Dawson pierced his hand with a screwdriver attempting to crack a coconut shell while on a school trip.

Discography

Albums
Richard Dawson Sings Songs and Plays Guitar (2007)
The Magic Bridge (2011)
The Glass Trunk (2013)
Nothing Important (2014)
Peasant (2017)
2020 (2019)
The Ruby Cord (2022)

Compilations
Stick In The Wheel presents From Here: English Folk Field Recordings Volume 2 (2019)
Republic of Geordieland (2020)

Collaborations
Dawson May Jazzfinger Clay with Nev Clay, Ally May and Jazzfinger (2009)
Moon — Diseasing Rock Who with Ben Jones and Sarah Sullivan (2011)
Dawson-Davies: Hen Ogledd with Rhodri Davies (2013)
Bronze by Hen Ogledd (Richard Dawson, Rhodri Davies, and Dawn Bothwell) (2016)
Mogic by Hen Ogledd (Richard Dawson, Rhodri Davies, Dawn Bothwell, Sally Pilkington, Will Guthrie) (2018)
Free Humans by Hen Ogledd (Richard Dawson, Rhodri Davies, Dawn Bothwell, and Sally Pilkington) (2020)
No Wood Accepted (EP) by Hen Ogledd (Richard Dawson, Rhodri Davies, Dawn Bothwell, and Sally Pilkington) (2021)
Henki (2021) with Circle

Additionally, over 60 releases with Sally Pilkington as Bulbils during 2020-2021.

Soundtracks
Motherland (2008)

As Eyeballs
Europa (2008)
The Roof of The World (2008)
Sea of William Henry Smyth (2008)
Seal-Skin Satellite (2008)
The Invisible Castle (2009)
The Quest (2009)
Thief of Men (2009)
Treasure (2009)
Eyeballs/Gareth Hardwick split (2009)
Eyeballs/White Dwarf Spiral split (2009)

References

External links
Official website
2014 interview with The Guardian

English male guitarists
English male singers
Avant-garde singers
Musicians from Newcastle upon Tyne
1981 births
Living people